Alexandre Berthier (1638–1708) was a captain in the French army who was born Isaac Berthier and a Huguenot. He became known as Alexandre after his arrival in New France in 1665. The name change appears to be because of his conversion to the Roman Catholic religion. He was part of the Carignan-Salières Regiment which arrived in Quebec that year from the West Indies under the command of Prouville de Tracy.

Berthier's first posting was as commandant of Fort de l'Assomption and during Prouville de Tracy's 1666 action against the Mohawks, he and Pierre de Saurel were co-commanders of the rear-guard of troops.

From 1674, Berthier spent most of his time settling and improving his seigneuries. He did lead a company of his own militia as part of an expeditionary force against the Senecas in 1687. This was part of the Brisay de Denonville's expedition. He was also actively involved in the fur trade along with some associates. His seigneury of Berthier-en-bas became his major project during his later years.

References 

 
 S.-A. Moreau, "Le capitaine Berthier," BRH, IX (1903) (French)

1638 births
1708 deaths
People of New France
17th-century French military personnel
Huguenots